Muhammad Rashid, known as       Rashid Senior, (14 April 1941 -- 26 January 2009) was a field hockey player from Pakistan. In certain books and other publications, besides on some websites, his name has been shown as Addul Rashid or Muhammad Abdul Rashid which is incorrect. He played in 1964 Summer Olympics and 1966 Asian Games. Pakistan won silver medal at both these events.

Suffix Senior
In 1968, another player Abdul Rashid (field hockey, born 1947) also started playing in the Pakistan hockey team. Therefore, to differentiate between them, suffixes 'Senior' and 'Junior' were added to their names and they were then on called Rashid Senior and Rashid Junior. Both played together in a number of international matches between 1968-69.

Death
Muhammad Rashid died on 26 January 2009 in Rawalpindi. He was laid to rest in the metroplitan's Harley Street graveyard.

See also
Abdul Rahshid I

References

External links
 

1941 births
2009 deaths
Field hockey players from Rawalpindi
Pakistani male field hockey players
Field hockey players at the 1964 Summer Olympics
Medalists at the 1964 Summer Olympics
Olympic field hockey players of Pakistan
Olympic silver medalists for Pakistan